The Park Mansion is a 36-storey condominium tower in Mississauga, Ontario standing 112 metres (369 feet) tall.  The building is located at 45 Kingsbridge Garden Circle.

It was built in 1990 (architects: Zippan and Barrett) and has over 350 luxury suites, many with views of the Greater Toronto Area.

Upon completion, it was the tallest building in Mississauga for an 18-year period until 2008; a year in which it was overtaken by 2 new buildings and tied by a third.

References

External links
 Official website
 The Park Mansion - description at Emporis.com

Buildings and structures in Mississauga
Postmodern architecture in Canada
Residential condominiums in Canada
Residential skyscrapers in Canada